Honores Rock is a rock lying  southwest of Ferrer Point in Discovery Bay, Greenwich Island, in the South Shetland Islands. The name derives from the forms "Islote Honores" and "Islote Cocinero Honores" given by the Chilean Antarctic Expedition (1947) after the cook of the expedition ship Iquique.

References

Rock formations of Antarctica